Moskovskaya is a station on both Line 1 and Line 2 line of the Nizhny Novgorod Metro. It was one of the first six stations to open on the line on 20 November 1985. It is also the only station that permits transfers from one line to the other. Passengers may also transfer to the main Nizhny Novgorod railway station. Also, the metro station Moskovskaya  is a transfer hub to the station of the City Rail Nizhny Novgorod-Moskovsky.

Until 2012, it was the northern terminus of the Avtozavodskaya line and, until the opening of Strelka station in 2018, it was the eastern terminus of the Sormovsko–Meshcherskaya line. Because the line curves westbound after Moskovskaya, it remains the easternmost station on the line.

It is in the Kanavinsky City District. The name comes from the Moskovsky railway station.

History 
The construction of the station began in 1977. The Moskovskaya station was built in an open way, due to which many roads and the station square were blocked. The station was built immediately under the perspective two lines, was make it the largest in the Soviet Union and today's Russia. In addition to the station itself, an extensive network of tunnels was built on the approach to it. Some of them connected the metro station with the Moskovsky railway station. The last such tunnel was built in 2018 and connected the station to the Central Department Store.

During the construction of the station, in 1984, the walls collapsed in its pit killing two workers from the student brigade. This accident served as the appearance of an “urban legend” about ghosts wandering through tunnels and stations. Workers at the station told that they had heard strange sounds in the tunnels: groans, gnash of iron or the sound of jackhammers. However, people are skeptical and believe that extraneous sounds in tunnels are a consequence of the penetration and activity of “diggers”.

The station was opened on November 20, 1985 as part of the first launch section of the Nizhny Novgorod Metro “Moskovskaya - Proletarskaya”.

From 1985 to 1993, she was the terminal station for the only Avtozavodskaya line. After the opening of the first section of the Sormovskaya line “Moskovskaya - Kanavinskaya”, it became final for her. A fork movement was organized at the station - trains of the Avtozavodskaya line “turned around” at the station and continued on their way along the Sormovskaya line. On November 4, 2012, after the opening of the Gorkovskaya station, it ceased to be the terminus for Avtozavodskaya line. And, after the opening of the Strelka station, June 12, 2018, the station has ceased to be terminus for both lines.

Name 
The metro station got its name because of the Moskovsky railway station and the Moscow highway. The project name is “Moskovsky vokzal”.

Entrances and interchanges 
The station has two underground vestibules for ingress and egress of passengers. Exit from the south-west hall leads to a long underground passage to the Moskovsky railway station and to the Moscow highway. On both sides of the station are stairs and escalators. Since November 4, 2012, the station is located transfer bridge from Line 1 to Line 2. One of the entrances is located next to the Revolution Square. Another entrance to the station was built in the building of the Central Department Store.

Nearby 
 Moskovsky railway terminal
 The Metro Department
 Central Department Store
 Mebelny bazar Mall
 McDonald's
 Respublika Shopping сentre
 Gordeevsky Department Store
 Kanavinskiy Bus Station
 Minin University
 College of Railway Transport
 Chkalov Shopping centre
 The Central Bazaar
 Kanavinsky Shopping centre

Connection

Nizhny Novgorod City Rail

Gallery

References

The station opened on 20 November 1985, as part of the first starting area of the Nizhny Novgorod metro "Moskovskaya — Proletarskaya".

Nizhny Novgorod Metro stations
Railway stations in Russia opened in 1985
1985 establishments in the Soviet Union
Railway stations located underground in Russia